Dunière-sur-Eyrieux (literally Dunière on Eyrieux) is a commune in the Ardèche department in southern France.

The commune's name was changed from Dunières-sur-Eyrieux to Dunière-sur-Eyrieux (without "s") on 1 January 2001.

Population

See also
Communes of the Ardèche department

References

Communes of Ardèche
Ardèche communes articles needing translation from French Wikipedia